Martinsville is an unincorporated community in western Harrison County, Missouri, United States.

The community is 2.5 miles east of the Harrison-Gentry county line at the intersection of Missouri routes F and D. Panther Creek flows past the northwest side of the community and Sampson Creek's headwaters are approximately 1.5 miles to the southwest.

History
Martinsville was laid out in 1856, and named after Zadoc Martin, the proprietor of a watermill. A post office called Martinsville has been in operation since 1868.

References

Unincorporated communities in Harrison County, Missouri
Unincorporated communities in Missouri